The Lake Wendouree Football Netball Club (nicknamed the Lakers) is an Australian rules football and netball club located in the Ballarat North suburb of Victoria. The football squad currently competes in the Ballarat Football League. The club is a result of a merger of the Wendouree Football Club and the Ballarat YCW Football Club at the end of 1994. 

Lake Wendouree Football Club competed in the Ballarat Football League for the first time in 1995. The club was runner up in its second season and played finals every year for the first six seasons.

Home ground
The football squad play their home matches at C.E. Brown Reserve, Ballarat North.

History

Ballarat YCW Football Club
Competed in senior competition between 1946 and 1949. The club concentrated on filling junior competitions until their merger in 1994.

Wendouree Football Club
Wendouree football club was reformed in 1946 and competed in district competitions around Ballarat before being a founding member of the Central Highlands Football League in 1979. The club won senior premierships in 1947, 1949, 1963, 1971, 1972, 1973, and 1983.

Post Merger 
In recent times, Lake Wendouree Junior Football Club have won several premierships with the Under 12 reserves and seniors winning the premiership in 2013. The Under 14s won the seniors and reserves premierships in 2015 and also the Under 14s seniors premiership in 2016. Both the under 16.5s reserves and seniors had success in their 2017 campaigns with the reserves being undefeated all year and only losing to a stacked Bacchus Marsh side. Some of the top players for the Lake Wendouree reserves for the game were Ethan Forbes, Harry Carter, Liam Vercoe, Bailey McCabe and Josh Canny. The seniors also had a great season, only losing 2 games during the regular season. They would defeat North Ballarat, previously the dominant side all year in the preliminary final. They would face North Ballarat again in the grand final and ultimately emerged victorious. The top players of the game for Lake Wendouree included Ned Nash, Jordy Clark, Iggy Duke and Will Clark.

VFL/AFL players
Con Britt - 
Des Tuddenham -  and 
Mark Orchard -  and 
Alex McDonald -  and 
James McDonald -  and 
James Walker - 
Jordan Roughead-  and 
Stephen Clifton- 
Dan Butler-  and

Ballarat Football League Premierships
Seniors 2010
Under 18.5 years  2002, 2004
Under 16.5 years  2003, 2006, 2017
Under 16. years  2001, 2002, 2015, 2016
Under 13.5 years 2003, 2004
Under 12 years  1997, 1998, 2001

Tony Lockett Medallists
1999 Daryl Jarred 103
2005 Brad Maxwell 83

Bibliography
 History of Football in the Ballarat District by John Stoward -

References

External links
Official website

Ballarat Football League clubs
1994 establishments in Australia
Sports clubs established in 1994
Australian rules football clubs established in 1994
Netball teams in Victoria (Australia)
Australian rules football clubs in Victoria (Australia)
Sport in Ballarat